The 1925–26 NHL season was the ninth season of the National Hockey League (NHL). The NHL dropped the Hamilton, Ontario team and added two new teams in the United States (US), the New York Americans and the Pittsburgh Pirates to bring the total number of teams to seven. The Ottawa Senators were the regular-season champion, but lost in the NHL playoff final to the Montreal Maroons. The Maroons then defeated the defending Stanley Cup champion Victoria Cougars of the newly renamed Western Hockey League three games to one in a best-of-five series to win their first Stanley Cup.

League business
A special meeting was held on September 22, 1925, to discuss expansion to New York City. The NHL approved the dropping of the Hamilton Tigers franchise and the adding of the New York Americans club, which would sign the Hamilton players after many had paid a reinstatement fee for their players strike the year before. The New York franchise was granted to Colonel J. S. Hammond and T. J. Duggan, although the ownership was held secretly by "Big Bill" Dwyer, an infamous bootlegger from New York City, to play in New York's Madison Square Garden.

At the annual meeting on November 7, 1925, the league added another new expansion franchise, in Pittsburgh, the third United States-based team in the NHL. The Ottawa Senators objected to the adding of the team, but were outvoted. The Pittsburgh team, known as the Pirates was formed because former Toronto NHA owner Eddie Livingstone had been again threatening to form a rival league and mentioned Pittsburgh as one of the possible franchise locations. League president Frank Calder and the governors quickly agreed to grant the Pittsburgh Yellow Jackets organization an NHL franchise, known as the Pittsburgh Pirates, like the baseball club. Odie Cleghorn left the Canadiens to sign on as playing-coach with Pittsburgh.

Tommy Gorman and Ted Dey sold their interests in the Ottawa Senators to T. Franklin Ahearn. Ahearn then hired a successful junior executive, Dave Gill, to be secretary-treasurer (general manager) of the team and Gill hired Alex Curry, a former Senators player in the old NHA, to coach the team. Gorman joined the Americans' organization.

The league imposed a salary cap of $35,000 per team in an effort to curb player's salaries. The Pittsburgh Pirates' Lionel Conacher was paid $7,500 for the season, the Montreal Maroons' Dunc Munro was also paid $7,500, the New York Americans' Billy Burch was paid $6,500, the Americans' Joe Simpson, and the Toronto Maple Leafs' Hap Day were paid $6,000.

Rule changes

 Only two players on defence within the blue line at a time.
 A faceoff for 'ragging the puck' unless playing short-handed.
 Only team captains would be allowed to talk to referees.
 Timekeepers would signal the end of a period with a gong instead of the referee's whistle.
 Goalkeeper pads were limited to 12" wide.
 14 player roster limits, only 12 to be dressed for any one game.
 Team salary cap of $35,000.

Regular season

The Hamilton Tigers had spent their first five seasons in the NHL in last place until last season where they went from worst to first. The success enjoyed by the Tigers players was not carried over to New York, though, as the Americans finished fifth overall with a record of 12–20–4.

Eddie Gerard improved the Montreal Maroons by signing Nels Stewart and Babe Siebert and signing former Olympian Dunc Munro for defence. The Maroons were on their way to glory. Nels Stewart not only set a record for goals by a first-year player, but became the first rookie to win the scoring title. Stewart also won the Hart Trophy as league MVP. Stewart's record of 34 goals remains an NHL record for rookies until 1970–71.

From the 1910–11 season Georges Vezina had been the Montreal Canadiens goaltender, and had led them to the Cup in 1916 and 1924. In the first game of this season, he collapsed on the ice as the second period got underway. It was found he had tuberculosis, and he died in March 1926. The Canadiens would finish last in the standings and miss the playoffs.

Ottawa's coach Curry was quite successful, as he took a team that had gone from fourth overall to first with an impressive record of 24–8–4, and the expansion Pittsburgh Pirates, with a strong cast of ex-amateurs led by future Hall of Famers Roy Worters and Lionel Conacher, finished third. The Pirates introduced "on-the-fly" player substitution to the NHL, a practice already in use in the Western League.

Highlights
First game at Madison Square Garden December 15, 1925

The first regular-season game at Madison Square Garden between the Montreal Canadiens and the expansion New York Americans was a big event. Opening ceremonies included performances by the Governor-General's Bodyguard Band of Ottawa and the United States Military Band from West Point, displays of 'fancy skating', a miniature game between the team's mascots and the opening faceoff was made by New York Mayor John F. Hylan and Tex Rickard. The attendance was 19,000 and the ticket prices ranged from $1.50 to $11.50. Gate receipts were donated to the Neurological Society of New York. Montreal won the game, officiated by Cooper Smeaton 3–1, and were awarded the new Prince of Wales Trophy. (The Trophy would subsequently be given as an award to the NHL playoff champions.)

Final standings

Playoffs
This is the last season that saw challengers from outside of the NHL compete for the Stanley Cup. At the beginning of the season, the Western Canada Hockey League renamed itself the Western Hockey League because one of its teams, the Regina Capitals, had moved to the States to play in Portland, Oregon. They were renamed the Portland Rosebuds.

Once again, the Victoria Cougars finished third in their league but once again won their league championship and the right to play for the Stanley Cup. The previous season, the Cougars beat the Montreal Canadiens for the Stanley Cup with that being the only time in NHL history in which a non-NHL team won the Cup. After the 1926 playoffs, the Western Hockey League would fold leaving the Stanley Cup entirely to the NHL. The Cup would never again be contested by a non-NHL team. This was also the only season in NHL history where the number of playoff berths was less than half of the number of teams in the league  and is the most recent season in which none of the Original Six qualified for the playoffs (as of 2016).

NHL championship
The second seed Montreal Maroons beat the third seed Pittsburgh Pirates and then went on to beat first place Ottawa Senators two goals to one in a two-game total goals series, thus capturing the O'Brien Cup, Prince of Wales Trophy and the right to play the Victoria Cougars for the Stanley Cup.

Stanley Cup Finals

Nels Stewart was "Old Poison" to the Victoria Cougars, as he scored six goals in the four games and goaltender Clint Benedict shut out the westerners three times.

Awards
The new Prince of Wales Trophy was introduced this season. It was first presented to the Montreal Canadiens as winners of the first game in the new Madison Square Garden. The Trophy was then intended to be used as a new trophy to be awarded to the champions of the National Hockey League. The existing O'Brien Cup, given also to the league champions, was not retired. Nels Stewart won the Hart for the first time in his career. Frank Nighbor won his second consecutive Lady Byng Trophy.

Player statistics

Scoring leaders
Note: GP = Games played; G = Goals; A = Assists; Pts = Points

Source: NHL.

Leading goaltenders
GP = Games played, GA = Goals against, SO = Shutouts, GAA = Goals against average

NHL Playoff leading scorer
Note: GP = Games played; G = Goals; A = Assists; Pts = Points

Coaches
Boston Bruins: Art Ross
Montreal Canadiens: Leo Dandurand
Montreal Maroons: Eddie Gerard
New York Americans: Tommy Gorman
Ottawa Senators: Alex Currie
Pittsburgh Pirates: Odie Cleghorn
Toronto St. Patricks: Eddie Powers

Debuts
The following is a list of players of note who played their first NHL game in 1925–26 (listed with their first team, asterisk(*) marks debut in playoffs):
Wildor Larochelle, Montreal Canadiens
Albert Leduc, Montreal Canadiens
Pit Lepine, Montreal Canadiens
Babe Siebert, Montreal Maroons
Nels Stewart, Montreal Maroons
Joe Simpson, New York Americans
Hec Kilrea, Ottawa Senators
Roy Worters, Pittsburgh Pirates
Harold Darragh, Pittsburgh Pirates
Baldy Cotton, Pittsburgh Pirates
Lionel Conacher, Pittsburgh Pirates
Hib Milks, Pittsburgh Pirates

Last games
The following is a list of players of note that played their last game in the NHL in 1925–26 (listed with their last team):
Gerry Geran, last active player to have been a member of the Montreal Wanderers franchise.  
Dave Ritchie, last active player to have been a member of the Quebec Bulldogs franchise.  
Georges Vezina, Montreal Canadiens

Transactions

See also
 List of Stanley Cup champions
 Western Hockey League
 List of pre-NHL seasons
 1925 in sports
 1926 in sports

References

 
 
 
 
 

Notes

External links
Hockey Database
NHL.com

 
NHL
1